The Asian Football Confederation's 1993 AFC Women's Championship was held from 3 to 12 December 1993 in Kuching, Malaysia. The tournament was won for the fourth consecutive time by China in the final against North Korea.

Group stage

Group A

Group B

Knockout stage

Semi-final

Third place match

Final

Winner

External links
 RSSSF.com

Women's Championship
AFC Women's Asian Cup tournaments
International association football competitions hosted by Malaysia
Afc
AFC Women's Championship
AFC Women's Championship
AFC Women's Championship